Pasiphila lita is a moth in the family Geometridae. It was described by Louis Beethoven Prout in 1916. It is found in Kenya, Malawi, South Africa and Zimbabwe.

References

External links

Moths described in 1916
lita
Moths of Africa